The Gateway, part of Harbour City, is the office buildings with shopping arcade at lower level in Tsim Sha Tsui, Kowloon, Hong Kong.

Tenants

Agoda has its Hong Kong Office in Tower 6. All Nippon Airways has its Hong Kong Office in Room 1908 in Tower 6.

References

External links

 Map of the Harbour City

Tsim Sha Tsui
Office buildings in Hong Kong
Shopping centres in Hong Kong